Douglas Lake Airport  is located adjacent to Douglas Lake, British Columbia, Canada.

References

External links
Page about this airport on COPA's Places to Fly airport directory

Registered aerodromes in British Columbia
Thompson-Nicola Regional District